Parachiton is a genus of polyplacophoran mollusc. The genus includes both extant and extinct species.

References 

Prehistoric chiton genera
Chiton genera